The national leader of the Ku Klux Klan is called either a Grand Wizard or an Imperial Wizard, depending on which KKK organization is being described.

Second Ku Klux Klan 
William Joseph Simmons (1880–1945) was the leader of the second Ku Klux Klan between 1915 and 1922.
James A. Colescott (1897–1950), Imperial Wizard, 1939-1944.  Colescott dissolved the organization after it was hit with a $685,000 lien by the IRS.
Samuel Green (1889–1949), Imperial Wizard for 1 day.

Other Ku Klux Klan movements 
Jeff Berry (1968–2013)
Samuel Bowers (1924–2006)
David Duke (born 1950)
Virgil Lee Griffin (ca. 1944–2009)
Thomas Robb (born 1946)
David Wayne Hull (born 1962)
Johnny Lee Clary (1959–2014), Imperial Wizard in 1989 of the White Knights Organization but subsequently renounced his membership and became an ordained Christian minister speaking against racism and movements such as the Ku Klux Klan.
Ron Edwards, Imperial Wizard of the Imperial Klans of America.
Robert Shelton (1930–2003), Imperial Wizard of the now defunct United Klans of America. 
Louis Beam (born 1946)
Bill Wilkinson, Imperial Wizard of the "Invisible Empire, Knights of the Ku Klux Klan", from 1975–1981.
Don Black (born 1953), formally imprisoned white nationalist and Imperial Wizard, from 1981–1987.
Eldon Edwards (1909–1960), Imperial Wizard of the KKK from 1953–1960.
Roy Elonzo Davis (1890-1967) Second in command of 1915 KKK under William Simmons, Grand Dragon of Texas under Eldon Edwards, Imperial Wizard of Original Knights of KKK 1958-1966
Samuel Roper (1895–1986), law enforcement officer turned Imperial Wizard of the KKK, from 1949–1950. He was preceded by Samuel Green, and was later succeeded by Eldon Lee Edwards.
Bob Jones (1930–1989), Grand Dragon of the United Klans of America in North Carolina from 1963–1967.
 Tom Metzger (1938–2020), Grand Wizard of the KKK in the 1970s. Founder of the White Aryan Resistance (WAR).

References

 
Ku Klux Klan